Elisabeth Kirchler (born 17 November 1963) is a retired Austrian alpine skier.

Biography
She did grow up in the small village Lanersbach, community Tux.  Her nickname is Lis or Lisi. Winning the silver medal in the Giant Slalom Race in the World Championships 1985 (female races were held at Santa Caterina) was a great surprise because she was known as a "speed racer" (and by the way, female racers of the Austrian Ski Federation weren't successful in that discipline since March 1978). Besides her four wins, she could achieve podiums as following: Place 2: downhill 4, Super-G 2, Giant Slalom 1, Alpine Combined 1; place 3: Alpine Combined 1. - Another results are: Olympics: Downhill 9th, in 1984; Downhill 8th, Super-G 15th, in 1988. - World Championships: Downhill 6th, Giant Slalom 8th, in 1982; Downhill 12th, in 1985; Downhill 22nd, in 1989. - She was an Austrian Champion in the giant slalom in 1983.

After retirement she was a commentator for the Austrian Television broadcaster ORF and a columnist for an Austrian newspaper for several years. She is married to a restaurant proprietor (Armin Riml); the couple lives at Sölden with three children.

World Cup victories

References

External links
 
 

1963 births
Living people
Austrian female alpine skiers
Alpine skiers at the 1984 Winter Olympics
Alpine skiers at the 1988 Winter Olympics
Olympic alpine skiers of Austria
People from Schwaz
Sportspeople from Tyrol (state)
20th-century Austrian women